Gol Gol-e Sofla (also Romanized as Gol Gol-e Soflá, also known as Gol Gol and Gulgul) is a village in Malavi Rural District in the Central District of Pol-e Dokhtar County, Lorestan Province, Iran. At the 2006 census, its population was 742 in 178 families.

References 

Towns and villages in Pol-e Dokhtar County